Tithi Bhattacharya is Associate Professor of South Asian history at Purdue University. She is a prominent Marxist feminist and one of the national organizers of the International Women's Strike on March 8, 2017. Bhattacharya is a vocal advocate of Palestinian rights and Boycott, Divestment and Sanctions (BDS). She is one of the authors of Feminism for the 99%: A Manifesto, which ties feminism to other modes of struggle, including anti-racism and anti-capitalism. On the topic of gender Bhattacharya has written the book The Sentinels of Culture, which developed from her dissertation on the British-educated middle class in 19th-century Kolkata. She has also written on the politics of Islamophobia and women in Islam.

In March 2022, Bhattacharya was one of 151 international feminists to sign Feminist Resistance Against War: A Manifesto, in solidarity with the Feminist Anti-War Resistance initiated by Russian feminists after the Russian invasion of Ukraine.

References

External links
 
 

Year of birth missing (living people)
Living people
American anti-capitalists
American women academics
American Marxists
Women Marxists
Purdue University faculty
Marxist feminists
American socialist feminists
Marxist theorists